The Imagination Movers are an American children's band formed in New Orleans, Louisiana, in 2003. The line-up includes drummer Rich Collins, keyboardist and mandolin player Scott Durbin, bassist Dave Poche, and guitarist Scott "Smitty" Smith. Members of the group were longtime friends and neighbors. They started with the four members seeing a need to encourage creativity in children, provide positive male role models, and create music and content that "spoke to them, not down to them." Scott Durbin as the progenitor, worked in combination with his other Movers to create a live-action TV show that was a cross between Mister Rogers' Neighborhood and Captain Kangaroo, the foursome worked every night after bedtime, from 9 PM to midnight, to write songs and develop TV show plot lines.

Career
Created by four friends in New Orleans, the Imagination Movers began as a television/music concept that was pitched to local PBS affiliates. WLAE-TV was the first to take an interest in the group and later introduced them to Beth Courtney, the President & Chief Executive Officer at Louisiana Public Broadcasting. Soon after, LPB began airing one-minute videos produced by the Imagination Movers themselves.

The Movers built a sizable regional following by setting educational songs for kids to melodies and rhythms that adults appreciate as well. They sold more than 100,000 copies of their self-produced CDs and DVDs. Their three indie CDs: "Good Ideas," "Calling All Movers," and "Eight Feet" along with their grassroots DVD "Stir It Up" have, combined, won fourteen national awards, from such groups as the National Association of Parenting Publications (NAPPA) and Parents' Choice.

In 1994, they appeared in a TV special called "The O'Jays and Friends: Live in Concert"

In early 2005, Disney took notice and initiated negotiations to add the Movers to the company's roster. These were interrupted in August when the flood protection designed and built by the Army Corps of Engineers to protect New Orleans failed. The resulting floodwater claimed the band's office, as well as the homes and jobs of Collins, Durbin, and Poche – but the deal was signed in the spring of 2006.

In 2008, Walt Disney Records introduced the Imagination Movers' music to the nation with the release of the Movers' first nationally released CD, "Juice Box Heroes."

In September 2008, a 22-minute show featuring the group began airing on the Disney Channel's preschool programming block known as Playhouse Disney, and eventually airing on Playhouse Disney's replacement, Disney Junior. The Movers starred and were also co-executive producers of the show.

The Movers wrote and performed all of the songs heard on their show. Moreover, the Imagination Movers have received critical kudos for their live concert performances.

In October 2009, the Imagination Movers started the "Live from the Idea Warehouse Concert Tour 2009". Traveling from mid-October to mid-December 2009 their live performances include many of their favorite songs and dancing, as well as video appearances of Warehouse Mouse.

Beginning in early-February 2011 and wrapping up in late May 2011, the Imagination Movers presented their "In a Big Warehouse Concert Tour," playing more than 100 shows in 50+ cities across North America.

From March to October 2012, the Imagination Movers toured North America on their post-Disney "Rock-O-Matic" tour. The show maintained several elements of the original TV concept, such as an on-stage "idea emergency" and several sets from their older catalog. The tour promoted the Imagination Movers' new album/DVD release, "Rock-O-Matic," which featured all new music from the band. The album Rock-O-Matic itself is produced independently of Disney and has a notably more mature, contemporary rock-and-roll sound, though still very appropriate for children.

In the summer of 2013, Imagination Movers released their fourth album on Disney records, entitled  "Back in Blue." The album consists of 26 songs, covering most of the songs written for season three of the TV series as well as any other unreleased material penned by the Movers for the television show.

Fall 2013, the Imagination Movers teamed with Blue Cross Blue Shield Association to present the Think Big Tour, an educational 60-minute concert traveling throughout the state of Louisiana.

May 2014 - Disney Junior Canada presented the Imagination Movers Live in Concert tour with special guest Warehouse Mouse. The tour covered seventeen Canadian cities, starting September 13 in Victoria, BC and ending in Glace Bay, NS on October 2, with a majority of the dates selling out. The tour featured the Movers performing songs from their hit Disney Junior series and their chart-topping album “Back In Blue,” which debuted as the No. 1 Children's Album on iTunes in Canada.

During the fall of 2014, 9 Story Entertainment announced that it has entered into a development deal with the award-winning musical act Imagination Movers. 9 Story teamed with the band on a concept called Super Movers, a fresh new animated/hybrid program geared towards 4-7-year-olds, bursting with comedy, adventure, and music. The main message of the show is that “Everybody has the power to become a superhero!”

In 2015, the Imagination Movers released their ninth album, a CD/DVD, entitled "Licensed to Move." The project was crowd funded through PledgeMusic.

In 2016, the Movers released the single "Super Movers," an upbeat, ska-inspired audio treat spreading the belief that everyone has the power to become a superhero. The song hit number 1 on the Children's Charts on both iTunes and Amazon in the US and Canada.

In 2017, the Imagination Movers crowdfunded their tenth album through Indiegogo, entitled "10-4." The album was released on December 14, 2018.

During 2020, the Movers released numerous unreleased songs via their Bandcamp page.

In the summer of 2021, the Movers released their first new product, a single called "Happy" and the Happy to Be Here EP, through children's music label 8 Pound Gorilla Records. Two music videos were part of the release as well "Happy" and "Robot Breaks Down" which can be viewed on the Movers YouTube channel.

In 2022, the Mover song "Watermelon Meow Meow" became a viral hit, averaging over 1 million monthly streams on Spotify alone. In appreciation, the Imagination Movers quirky earworm was finally given form in a consciousness-expanding music video.

Members

Rich Collins

This multi-instrumentalist works the controls in the recording studio. He is the Imagination Movers' drummer on the TV show but plays guitar, bass, and occasionally drums in concert. His drum sticks double as "Scribble Sticks", which he uses to draw words and pictures on the TV screen.

Originally from Silver Spring, MD, Collins graduated from The Catholic University of America and relocated to New Orleans in the early 1990s to form a rock band, Dubly. The husband and father of five lost his home in 2005 during Hurricane Katrina.  Before the formation of The Imagination Movers, Collins was a journalist. He is currently working on his own music on top of the Imagination Movers, and recently released his second album, Golden Pick, following the release of his solo debut, That Escalated Quickly, in 2013.

Scott Durbin

The initial inspiration for Imagination Movers came in 2003 from Durbin, who wanted to create a live action local kids show that presented strong male role models for children. Durbin was inspired by the likes of Captain Kangaroo and Fred Rogers as well as the musical stylings of The Police and De La Soul.

The son of a second-generation Methodist minister and chaplain in the US Army, Durbin lived the life of an army brat, residing in various places around the world including Washington, D.C., San Antonio, and Thailand, before his family settled in New Orleans when he was around seven years old. He studied abroad in both high school and college, living in Japan and Denmark. He has since moved because of Hurricane Katrina. He currently lives in Lafayette.

Before the formation of the Movers, Durbin received his undergraduate degree in religious studies from Centenary College of Louisiana and his graduate teaching certification from the University of New Orleans. He taught for a total of ten years, which was one of his inspirations for the Imagination Movers. The first six years were at Norco Elementary 4-6 in the St. Charles Parish Public School system where he was awarded Teacher of the Year from his school. Later, he joined the faculty at Isidore Newman School in Orleans Parish and again received recognition, receiving the New Teacher of the Year award his first year there. He is married and has two children.

In the Idea Warehouse, Durbin, who plays the mandolin, keyboards, and melodica on the show, also wears "Wobble Goggles," which allow him to see things from a variety of perspectives.

In 2015, Durbin joined the faculty at the University of Louisiana at Lafayette as an instructor and coordinator of the Music Business Program. He is now an Assistant Professor and recently received the Sue and Chuck Lein Endowed Professorship in Music Business, 2021-2024.

Dave Poche
An architect by trade, Poche was part of the design team for the New Orleans Saints practice facilities and also designed various New Orleans-based banks, office buildings, and hotels. He most recently worked on several designs that are part of the post-Katrina rebuild efforts.

As 'Imagination Mover Dave,' Poche is the Movers' "jack-of-all-trades," using his red gadget hat as a storage device for a variety of objects, many of which he uses to make his cool gizmos and contraptions. Poche is also responsible for creating the concept of the Warehouse Mouse puppet, a mainstay in the series.

An active father, he has taken time from his busy schedule to serve as a Cub Scout den Akela as well as a coach for his children's T-ball, basketball, and soccer teams.

While he has no formal theatrical or musical training, Poche did fiddle with the bass briefly in college and has a colorful performance background that includes a stint as a stand-up comic. Like his fellow Movers, he is inspired by 1980s and '90s rock, pop and alternative music and by his front-lines experience dealing with his children's sleepless nights, messy playrooms and other growing pains. Poche plays bass guitar on the Imagination Movers T.V. Show and during live performances

Originally from Baton Rouge, Poche received his degree from Louisiana State University and moved to his wife's hometown of New Orleans. Despite losing their home to Hurricane Katrina, the couple has returned to the New Orleans area where they currently reside with their children.

Scott "Smitty" Smith
Smitty, a captain in the New Orleans Fire Department, was part of the Hurricane Katrina search-and-rescue effort. While he was the only Mover not to lose his home to the storm, his firehouse was destroyed.

Guitarist for the Movers, Smith is the adventurous outdoorsman of the group; growing up in Southern Louisiana, he hunted and fished every weekend as a child, and continues to do so in his spare time. He enjoys exploring America's National Parks. Smith brings his outdoor experiences to the group by blowing duck and goose calls on some of the band's songs, including "I Heard That."

An English Literature graduate of the University of New Orleans, Smith's given Mover prop is his trusty journal, which represents his Indiana Jones-like scholarly personality and is used as a resource when the Movers are trying to solve a problem.

A New Orleans native, Smith resides in New Orleans with his wife, Mary, their daughter, and two dogs.

Personnel

Official members
Rich Collins – vocals, drums, guitar
Scott Durbin – vocals, keyboards, mandolin, banjo
Dave Poche – vocals, bass
Scott "Smitty" Smith – vocals, guitar

Touring members
Kyle Melancon – drums, percussion

Recognition
On March 22, 2008, the Imagination Movers were one of the entertainment groups to perform at the annual White House Easter Egg Roll on the White House South Lawn. Again in 2009, the Movers performed at the annual White House Easter Egg Roll for U.S. President Barack Obama.

On August 21, 2008, the Imagination Movers performed on "Good Morning America".
 
The Imagination Movers won a 2009 Daytime Entertainment Emmy Award for Outstanding Original Song in the category of Children's and Animation for their original song "Boing, Cluck, Cluck."

The Movers have been nominated twice for Daytime Emmy Awards in the category of Outstanding Original Song: 2009 & 2011.

In 2011, the Imagination Movers TV series received a WGA Award for Children's Episodic & Specials - “Happy Ha-Ha Holidays” (Imagination Movers), Written by Michael G. Stern, Randi Barnes, Rick Gitelson, Scott Gray; Disney Channel.

According to Pollstar, the Movers ranked #79 on the Top 100 tours North American tours of 2011. Due to their success as live performers, the Imagination Movers were also featured on the cover of Pollstar.

The Imagination Movers are National Buddy Walk Partners with the National Down Syndrome Society.

Discography
The band has released ten albums and one extended play.

Rec Room Records
 Good Ideas (2003)
 Calling All Movers (2004)
 Stir It Up - DVD release (2004)
 Eight Feet (2005)
 Licensed to Move CD/DVD (2015)
 10-4 (2018)

Disney Records
 Juice Box Heroes (2008)
 For Those About to Hop (2009)
 In a Big Warehouse (2010)
 Back In Blue (2013) - digital release only

Razor & Tie
 Rock-O-Matic - CD/DVD (28 February 2012)

8 Pound Gorilla
 Happy to Be Here - digital release only (27 August 2021)

Series

Episodes

References

External links

 Imagination Movers official website
 Imagination Movers on Disney Junior
 White House 2008 Easter Egg Roll Frequently Asked Questions

American pop music groups
American children's musical groups
Walt Disney Records artists